This is a list of Norwegian television related events from 1987.

Events

Debuts

Television shows

Ending this year

Births

Deaths

See also
1987 in Norway

 
Television